Loch Treig is a 9 km freshwater loch situated in a steep-sided glen 20 km east of Fort William, in Lochaber, Highland, Scotland. While there are no roads alongside the loch, the West Highland Line follows its eastern bank.

Since 1929 Loch Treig has been a reservoir, retained behind the Treig Dam, forming part of the Lochaber hydro-electric scheme, which required diversion of the West Highland Railway.  The increase in water level following the construction of the dam submerged the hamlets of Kinlochtreig and Creaguaineach at the loch's southern end, which were stopping points on a cattle drovers' road along the Road to the Isles, which linked up Lochaber and the Inner Hebrides to markets in Perthshire in the south.

See also 
List of reservoirs and dams in the United Kingdom

References 

Treig
Treig
Lochaber
Treig